The Monticello Historic Commercial District, around Main and Columbus Streets in Monticello, Kentucky, is a  historic district which was listed on the National Register of Historic Places in 1982.

It includes a United States Post Office among its 11 contributing buildings.

The modern Wayne County Courthouse is excluded from the district.

References

Historic districts on the National Register of Historic Places in Kentucky
National Register of Historic Places in Wayne County, Kentucky
Commercial buildings on the National Register of Historic Places in Kentucky
Monticello, Kentucky